The Western Himalayan subalpine conifer forests is a temperate coniferous forests ecoregion of the middle and upper elevations of the western Middle Himalayas of Nepal, India, and Pakistan.

Setting
It extends west from the Gandaki River in Nepal, through the Indian states of Uttarakhand, Himachal Pradesh, and Jammu and Kashmir into northern Pakistan. This belt of conifers is the highest expanse of woodland to be found on the slopes of the Himalayas, treeless alpine scrub lying just above its ecotopic frontier. It is a valuable ecosystem as many Himalayan birds and animals migrate seasonally up and down the mountains spending part of the year in the conifer forests, so conservation is a high priority.

This ecoregion is drier than the Eastern Himalayan subalpine conifer forests, which receive more moisture from the Bay of Bengal monsoon.

Flora
Several distinct forest types are found in this ecoregion. Fir trees (Abies spectabilis) in places grow in nearly pure stands. In other areas they mix with oaks (Quercus semecarpifolia). Rhododendron campanulatum, Abies spectabilis, and birch (Betula utilis) form another common assemblage. Elsewhere mixed-conifer forests are made up of Abies spectabilis, blue pine (Pinus wallichiana) and spruce (Picea smithiana). Cupressus torulosa and Cedrus deodara are also found here. 
A recently published major new monograph, Conifers Around the World, treats the high-level western Himalayan fir tree as Abies gamblei (apparently, A. spectabilis does not reach this region!)

Following are some notable conifers present in the area:

Fir: Abies pindrow, Abies spectabilis and Abies gamblei.

Pine: Pinus roxburghii, Pinus wallichiana and Pinus gerardiana.

Spruce: Picea smithiana.

Cypress: Cupressus torulosa.

Juniper: Juniperus communis, Juniperus indica, Juniperus squamata, Juniperus recurva, Juniperus excelsa subsp. polycarpos, etc.

Cedrus: Cedrus deodara.

Taxus: Taxus contorta and Taxus wallichiana.

Ephedra: Ephedra gerardiana, Ephedra intermedia.

Fauna
This ecoregion is home to some fifty-eight species of mammals. Important inhabitants include the brown bear and threatened or endangered species such as Himalayan serow, Himalayan tahr, and the markhor goat, the national symbol of Pakistan. The only endemic mammal is a rodent, the murree vole (Hyperacrius wynnei).

About 285 species of birds have been recorded in this ecoregion, including 9 endemic species and a number of birds that are sensitive to habitat disturbance and therefore likely to be vulnerable to further forest clearance. These include the Koklass pheasant (Pucrasia macrolopha), western tragopan (Tragopan melanocephalus), and the Himalayan monal (Lophophorus impejanus).

Threats and conservation
Despite being relatively thinly populated some seventy percent of the conifer forest has been cleared or degraded, partly to make way for terrace cultivation. However it still contains some of the least disturbed forests in the western Himalayas. Protected areas that contain areas of conifer forest include Great Himalayan National Park and Rupi Bhabha Sanctuary in Himachal Pradesh, Kishtwar National Park in Jammu and Kashmir,  Gangotri National Park and Govind Pashu Vihar Wildlife Sanctuary in Uttarakhand, all in India, and Royal Dhorpatan Hunting Reserve in Nepal. A particular threat comes from disturbance of nesting birds during the collection of morel mushrooms in spring.

Extraction of firewood for heating among rural populations in Pakistan has degraded forests at some locations.

See also
Himalayan silver fir forests — plant community within the ecoregion.

List of ecoregions in India

References

Ecoregions of the Himalayas
Ecoregions of India
Ecoregions of Nepal
Ecoregions of Pakistan

Forests of India
Forests of Pakistan
Himalayan forests
Indomalayan ecoregions
Temperate coniferous forests
 
Forests of Nepal